Christian Michael Longo (born January 23, 1974) is a convicted murderer who killed his wife and three children in Oregon.

Background
Originating from Ypsilanti Township, Michigan, Longo married Mary Jane Baker at age 19 and had three children with her. Longo and his family often encountered financial difficulties due to his reckless spending habits.

Murders
The Longos were a seemingly average, middle-class family and resided in Waldport, Oregon. Christian was employed at a local Starbucks, while Mary Jane was a full-time mother. Mary Jane was a member of the Jehovah's Witnesses and was an active member of her church. By all accounts, the two devoted their time to raising their three young children. The Longos were married in 1993; at the time of the murders, the couple had been married for eight years and enjoyed sailing and jigsaw puzzles in their spare time.

On December 17, 2001, a coworker recognized an artist's sketch of a boy discovered in Lint Slough. A neighbor reported seeing her 1999 Dodge Grand Caravan parked in the driveway outside the Longos' home. Once neighbors and friends realized that all five Longos were missing, a frantic search began.

The body of four-year-old Zachary Longo was found on December 19, 2001, in Lint Slough. Divers located the body of three-year-old Sadie on December 22, less than a mile offshore in the Pacific Ocean. 27-year-old Mary Jane and their two-year-old daughter Madison were found five days later. Mary Jane had been stuffed nude in suitcases found in the water near a ramp at Embarcadero Marina on December 27, 2001. Madison was found inside a different suitcase the same day, dropped off on the same dock. An autopsy revealed that Sadie and Zachary were killed by asphyxiation while Mary Jane Longo and Madison had been strangled. Police have stated that if Zachary's body had not washed ashore, they would not have recovered the bodies of his sisters and mother for another 10–15 years due to the tide.

After he fled the United States, Longo was recognized at a hotel in Cancún, Mexico, on December 27, 2001. By that time, Longo was wanted in connection with the murder of his wife and three children. The next day, in Lincoln County, Oregon, a federal arrest warrant issued in the United States District Court for the District of Oregon charged him with multiple counts of aggravated murder and unlawful flight. He left the hotel on January 7, 2002, and was captured six days later without incident in the small town of Tulum, Quintana Roo, about 80 miles south of Cancún. He was taken into U.S. custody at George Bush Intercontinental Airport on January 14, 2002. He was sentenced to death in 2003.

Years later, Longo admitted to being a narcissist in a letter he wrote to a woman that was obtained by KATU-TV, a television station located in Portland, Oregon. He wrote that he eventually began "studying what a psychologist said I was and came to terms with it, almost totally agreeing that he was right... his conclusion was the narcissistic personality disorder which he called 'compensatory' – basically self-centeredness related to a damaged core sense of self."

When in Mexico, Longo used the name of Michael Finkel, the former New York Times reporter who later chronicled their experiences in his memoir True Story, which was adapted into a 2015 film starring James Franco as Longo and Jonah Hill as Finkel.

Longo was incarcerated on death row at Oregon State Penitentiary. On December 13, 2022, Longo's death sentence (along with everyone else on Oregon's death row) was commuted to life without parole by Governor Kate Brown.

See also 
 FBI Ten Most Wanted Fugitives, 2000s

Further reading

 Michael Finkel. (2005) True Story: Murder, Memoir, Mea Culpa. New York City: HarperCollins Publishers.

References 

Living people
1974 births
2001 murders in the United States
American mass murderers
American murderers of children
American prisoners sentenced to death
Familicides
FBI Ten Most Wanted Fugitives
Fugitives
People convicted of murder by Oregon
People extradited from Mexico to the United States
People from Lincoln County, Oregon
People from Ypsilanti, Michigan
People with narcissistic personality disorder
Place of birth missing (living people)
Prisoners sentenced to death by Oregon
Recipients of American gubernatorial clemency